Amanullah Khan Zadran is a citizen of Afghanistan who has held several prominent positions of power.

Amanullah was a Taliban leader, who defected after the American invasion, and was appointed to cabinet as Minister of Tribal and Border Affairs by Afghan President Hamid Karzai in December 2001.

Amanullah's older brother, Pacha Khan Zadran, whose forces had always resisted the Taliban, had been briefly appointed the Governor of Paktia in December 2001, had fought with other tribal militia leaders, had been replaced by a newly appointed governor, and had refused to willingly surrender power.
American forces eventually took a role in this local civil war, and characterized Pacha Khan Zadran a renegade, forcing him underground.
The BBC reported that both Amanullah and Pacha Khan were handed over to the Afghan authorities by Pakistani authorities in February 2004.

References

Pashtun people
Living people
Government ministers of Afghanistan
Afghan expatriates in Pakistan
Year of birth missing (living people)